The Woman He Loved is a 1988 British HTV made-for-television romantic drama film for ITV about the abdication of Edward VIII. Directed by Charles Jarrott, it stars Anthony Andrews, Jane Seymour and Olivia de Havilland. Jane Seymour was nominated for a Golden Globe Award for Best Actress – Miniseries or Television Film at the 46th Golden Globe Awards  and Julie Harris was nominated for a Primetime Emmy Award for Outstanding Supporting Actress in a Miniseries or a Movie. Costume designer Robin Fraser-Paye was also nominated for Primetime Emmy Award for Outstanding Costume Design for a Miniseries or a Special.
It was partly shot at Shirenewton Hall in Monmouthshire. This was Olivia de Havilland's final acting role, before her death in 2020.

Cast
Anthony Andrews as Prince of Wales
Jane Seymour as Wallis Simpson
Olivia de Havilland as Aunt Bessie Merryman
Lucy Gutteridge as Thelma Furness, Viscountess Furness
Tom Wilkinson as Ernest Simpson
Julie Harris as Alice Warfield (Mrs Simpson's mother)
Robert Hardy as Winston Churchill
Phyllis Calvert as Queen Mary
Evelyn Laye as Maud Cunard
David Waller as Stanley Baldwin - He also appeared as Baldwin in ITV's Edward & Mrs Simpson (1978).
 Rupert Frazer as Peregrine Francis Adelbert Cust, 6th Baron Brownlow (Equerry to the Prince of Wales)
Charlotte Mitchell as Lady Chatfield
Margaretta Scott as Lady Wigram
Richard Wilson as Norman Birkett, 1st Baron Birkett

References

External links
 

1988 films
1988 television films
1988 romantic drama films
Cultural depictions of the Edward VIII abdication crisis
British romantic drama films
Television series by ITV Studios
Television shows produced by Harlech Television (HTV)
English-language television shows
Cultural depictions of Stanley Baldwin
Cultural depictions of Winston Churchill
Films directed by Charles Jarrott
1980s British films
British drama television films